Robert Ker, 2nd Duke of Roxburghe ( – 20 August 1755) was a Scottish peer.

Ker was the only son of the 1st Duke of Roxburghe and Lady Mary Finch, daughter of Daniel Finch, 2nd Earl of Nottingham, by his first wife Lady Essex Rich. On 24 May 1722 he was created Earl Ker, of Wakefield in the County of York, and Baron Ker, of Wakefield in the County of York (both in the Peerage of Great Britain).

On 16 June 1739 he married his half-cousin Essex Mostyn, daughter of Sir Roger Mostyn, 3rd Baronet, and Essex Finch, daughter of above-mentioned Earl of Nottingham by his 2nd wife Hon. Anne Hatton. They had five children:
 Lord John Ker, later 3rd Duke of Roxburghe
 Lady Essex Ker (born 9 Mar 1742 – died an infant)
 Lady Essex Ker (born 25 Mar 1744), a bridesmaid at Queen Charlotte's wedding 1761, died unmarried
 Lady Mary Ker (born 17 Mar 1746), died unmarried
 Lt. Col. Lord Robert Ker (27 Aug 1747 – 20 Mar 1781)

Robert Ker inherited his father's title in 1741 and died in 1755. He was succeeded by his eldest son John.

Ancestry

References

External links

1700s births
1755 deaths
2